A Christmas Calendar is a 1987 American Christmas television special hosted and narrated by Loretta Swit. The program was co-produced for PBS by Deutsche Welle and Oregon Public Broadcasting and premiered December 18, 1987 on PBS.

Description
Loretta Swit travels to Germany to discover the holiday traditions in the European country. Swit journeys through various regions of Germany including spending some of the holiday with a German family. She discovers the origins of St Nicholas, the Christmas traditions such as the Christkindlmarkt as well as show the viewers the winter scenery of the country. The program includes seasonal music with insight of the origins of the titles.

Cast
 Loretta Swit
 Reinhardt Schmidt
 Theresia Schmidt
 Felicia Sharon
 Barry Sharon
 Regensburger Domspatzen
 Fischer Choir of Stuttgart

Production
Location scenes for the program included Nuremberg, Munich, Aachen, Stuttgart, Hamburg, and Berlin, Germany. The program has not been released on VHS or DVD.

See also
Loretta Swit

References

External links

1987 television specials
1980s American television specials
PBS original programming
American Christmas television specials